Gagandeep Kang FRS (born 3 November 1962) is an Indian Microbiologist and virologist who is the Professor in the Department of Gastrointestinal Sciences at the Christian Medical College, Vellore, India and from August 2016 to July 2020 was executive director of the Translational Health Science and Technology Institute, Faridabad, an autonomous institute of the Department of Biotechnology, Ministry of Science and Technology, Government of India. She is a leading researcher with a major research focus on viral infections in children, and the testing of rotaviral vaccines. She also works on other enteric infections and their consequences when children are infected in early life, sanitation and water safety. She was awarded the prestigious Infosys Prize in Life Sciences in 2016 for her contributions to understanding the natural history of rotavirus and other infectious diseases. In 2019, she became the first Indian woman to be elected as a Fellow of the Royal Society. She was on the Life Sciences jury for the Infosys Prize in 2020. 

Kang is co-author of book Till We Win: India's Fight Against The COVID-19 Pandemic, with Chandrakant Lahariya, a leading Indian medical doctor and Public policy and health system expert and Randeep Guleria, the director of AIIMS, New Delhi. The book has been published by India's leading publisher Penguin Random House India and has become an instant bestseller.

Early life and education
Gagandeep Kang was born in Shimla on 3 November 1962. Her mother taught English and history and her father was a mechanical engineer in the Indian Railways. Kang grew up moving around north and east India, changing schools 10 times. She practiced science frequently at home during her childhood, building a lab with her father at home when she was 12 and experimenting in biology, physics and chemistry.

Kang completed her Bachelor of Medicine, Bachelor of Surgery (MBBS) in 1987 and her Doctor of Medicine (MD) in Microbiology in 1991 from Christian Medical College, Vellore and obtained her PhD in 1998. She obtained her membership of the Royal College of Pathologists and carried out postdoctoral research with Mary K. Estes at the Baylor College of Medicine, Houston before returning to the Christian Medical College.

Career and research 
Kang is a medical scientist who has worked on diarrhoea diseases and public health in India since the early 1990s. She is a key contributor to rotavirus epidemiology and vaccinology in India. Focusing on vaccines, enteric infections and nutrition in young children in disadvantaged communities, she has combined field epidemiology with intensive laboratory investigations to inform both the science of infectious diseases and policy in India. Her comprehensive research on rotavirus has demonstrated the high burden of rotavirus disease across India, the genetic diversity of viruses, the lower protection from infection and vaccines and the exploration of several approaches to improve the performance of oral vaccines. Her work has led to her being described as India's "vaccine godmother".

She has published over 300 scientific papers and is or was on editorial boards for several journals, including PLoS Neglected Tropical Diseases, Current Opinion in Infectious Diseases and Tropical Medicine and International Health. She is on many review committees for national and international research funding agencies, and has served on several advisory committees mainly related to vaccines, including India's National Technical Advisory Group on Immunisation, the WHO's Global Advisory Committee on Vaccine Safety and the Immunisation and Vaccine Implementation Research Advisory Committee. She chairs the WHO SEAR's Regional Immunisation Technical Advisory Group (2015–present). She has received honorary appointments as an associate faculty member at the Johns Hopkins University Bloomberg School of Public Health in Baltimore, Maryland and adjunct professor at Tufts University School of Medicine in Boston, Massachusetts.

Kang played a significant role in the efforts that culminated in the development of Rotavac, a vaccine from Bharat Biotech that targets diarrhea. She was one of three principal investigators in the Phase III clinical trials of the vaccine. Her initial interest was in identifying the correlates of protection against the rotavirus. She and others began by recreating a study conducted in Mexico to identify children protected from rotaviral infection, research the immune responses and isolate the correlate of protection. The recreated study itself did not succeed, but it did develop high quality laboratory methods for the detection of rotaviruses. Kang and one of her students subsequently established vaccine assays for rotavirus infections, used in testing Rotavac.

Since 2020, Kang has been an ex-officio member of a working group on COVID-19 vaccines established by the Strategic Advisory Group of Experts at the WHO.

Other activities
 Global Health Centre, Graduate Institute of International and Development Studies, Member of the International Advisory Board (since 2020)
 Bill and Melinda Gates Foundation, Member of the Global Health Scientific Advisory Committee

Recognition
Kang is the first Indian woman scientist to be elected a Fellow of the Royal Society (FRS) in 359 years of history of this scientific academy. She was the ninth woman to be awarded the Infosys Prize. She is the first Indian and the first woman to edit Manson's Textbook of Tropical Medicine. Other awards and honours include:

 1998-1999 – Dr. P.N. Berry Fellowship
 2005 – The Lourdu Yedanapalli Award for Excellence in Research
 2006 – Woman Bioscientist of the Yearś
 2016 – Infosys Prize in Life Sciences
 2019 – Elected a Fellow of the Royal Society (FRS)

References

1962 births
Living people
Indian women biologists
Indian immunologists
Fellows of the Royal Society
Female Fellows of the Royal Society